"Disneyland" is the 22nd episode of the third season of the American sitcom Modern Family and the series' 70th overall. It first aired on ABC on May 9, 2012. It was written by Cindy Chupack and directed by James Bagdonas.

Plot
The entire family goes on a day trip to Disneyland in Anaheim, California.

Luke (Nolan Gould) and Phil (Ty Burrell) are excited to ride roller coasters together at Disneyland, after Luke finally meets the height requirements to ride them. Phil panics when he feels unwell after riding Indiana Jones Adventure and worries even more when Jay (Ed O'Neill) tells him it's a normal reaction for someone as they get older. Hearing this from his father-in-law, Phil decides to repress his ill state and ride Big Thunder Mountain Railroad with Luke to prove he's still young. Phil is later relieved to discover that he only feels ill because he has come down with the flu.

Claire (Julie Bowen) decides to introduce Haley (Sarah Hyland) to her friend's nephew, Ethan (Matt Prokop), who's tagging along with her family on the trip. The two get along but Claire's plans are foiled when the family encounter Dylan (Reid Ewing), Haley's on-and-off ex-boyfriend, who is surprised by her presence at the park and reveals he was fired from the dude ranch he was working at in Wyoming; it was later revealed he was working at Disneyland as a Dapper Dan. Alex (Ariel Winter) eventually ends up taking a liking to Ethan whilst Haley dwells over why Dylan did not tell her he was back in town. Claire manages to pull Alex away from Ethan and persuades Haley to spend time with him again. It takes a turn for the worse when Ethan assaults Dylan, dressed in costume as Little John (from Robin Hood), which he disguised himself in order to speak with Haley. Ethan eventually separates to join a group of friends and Haley and Dylan decide to get back together, after he gets fired from the park, now needing a ride home from her family.

Mitchell (Jesse Tyler Ferguson) and Cam (Eric Stonestreet) have been having difficulties with Lily (Aubrey Anderson-Emmons) when she keeps running away from them. They are forced to resort to take her to Disneyland on a child leash in order to keep her safe. Mitchell eventually decides to take it off her due to the horrified looks of other parkgoers towards him and Cam. Lily runs off again and Jay fixes the problem by buying her a pair of child high heels, to prevent her from running.

Meanwhile, Gloria (Sofía Vergara) and Jay argue over her choice of footwear for the park. Despite a warning from Jay, Gloria decides to wear high heels to Disneyland, which quickly become uncomfortable for her to walk in. Sympathetic, Jay buys a pair of slippers for her to wear instead.

Manny (Rico Rodriguez) refuses to enjoy himself and instead tries to win a stock market school project with his friend, Reuben, over the phone.

The episode ends with Jay making everyone go to Great Moments with Mr. Lincoln, recalling how he alone took Claire and Mitchell to the park as kids after a fight with his then-wife, DeDe. He had initially planned to go home to break off their marriage, but after listening to the animatronic President Abraham Lincoln, he decided to stick with his marriage for the sake of his children, and that in doing so, the universe rewarded him, by introducing his now-wife Gloria into his life, as Gloria asks Jay if he wants to join her in the jacuzzi.

Reception

Ratings
In its original American broadcast, "Disneyland" was watched by 10.58 million viewers; up 0.52 million from the previous episode. It also acquired a 4.4/12 rating share in the 18-49 demographic group.

Reviews

Donna Bowman of The A.V. Club gave a B grade to the episode. She said "this wasn’t the funniest episode bow to stern", but she "found it charming".

Leigh Raines of TV Fanatic gave a 4.5/5 grade and said "the most touching thing about this episode was when Jay revealed why he loved the Abraham Lincoln robotic show. It wasn't because of the show, the performance itself it probably a little dull. But it made him realize that he needed to put his kids first. Jay isn't very expressive about his feelings, so it was nice when he opened up about his love for Claire and Mitchell."

Christine N. Ziemba of Paste Magazine rated the episode with 8/10 and said: "pushing that marketing angle aside, 'Disneyland' turned out to be a decent episode, faring much better than the past two offerings, with better integration of stories and more laughs—which is always great for a sitcom."

Michael Adams of 411mania rated the episode with 9/10 saying that he loved the episode. "It's so great to see the show do things like this. I thought the Hawaiian vacation the family took at the end of season 1 was one of the best episodes over the course of the 3 seasons, however, this vacation is by far the superior one."

References

2012 American television episodes
Modern Family (season 3) episodes
Disneyland
Television episodes set in amusement parks